GAFOR ("General Aviation Forecast") is a format for reporting weather information for aviation purposes. The GAFOR is used in many European countries. In order to easy transmit and understand GAFOR forecasts, the original (local) names are systematically replaced by a code number. There are two kinds of application:
 In France  and Germany   for example the GAFOR - Code refers to regions. 
 In Switzerland, Austria, Croatia and Slovenia the code refers to often used or simply usable and therefore predefined routes for crossing the country. This is a special need for the alpine or other mountainous regions, where VFR routing between mountains higher than the physical performance of pilots (oxygen) or the aircraft are common.

GAFOR codes

The GAFOR gives information on weather conditions (VIS/ceiling) prevailing along the main VFR Routes in Switzerland, Austria, Croatia and Slovenia. VIS and ceiling conditions considered, four weather categories are distinguished:

X: closed
M: marginal
D: difficult
O: open

Other weather phenomena dangerous for aviation, such as icing and turbulence are forecasted in GAMET or flight forecast. For this reason they are not taken into account in GAFOR.

Transmission of Swiss GAFOR

The GAFOR is spoken on magnetic disk or tape at Zurich and Genève. The forecast enumerates weather categories in chronological order, first for groups of routes REF: 4.4.2 then for single routes REF: 4.4.3, using the ICAO spelling alphabet:

 O	=	OSCAR 
 D	=	DELTA 
 M	=	MIKE 
 X	=	X-RAY

GAFOR Routes (groups) in Switzerland
Each group is or can be divided into several distinct routes, e.g. for choosing one of different possible passes through the Alps.

Groups of routes:
 00 Basel-Schaffhausen-Altenrhein
 10 Genève-Grenchen-Zürich-Altenrhein
 20 Montreux-Bern-Zürich
 30 Spiez-Meiringen-Brünig-Goldau
 40 Genève-Simplonpass-Lugano
 50 Basel-Gemmipass-Sion
 70 Zürich-Gotthardpass-Lugano
 80 Zürich-Lukmanierpass-Biasca
 90 Altenrhein-Julierpass-Malojapass-Lugano
 99 Alle Routen/All routes/Tutte le rotte/Toutes les routes

Service distribution in Switzerland

Meteorological information is available at the aerodromes (Selfbriefing Station). They are also available on telephone, FAX, SMS and internet.

Issue hour	Validity	
 0500 UTC	0600-1200 UTC	
 0845 UTC	0900-1500 UTC	
 1145 UTC	1200-1800 UTC	
 1445 UTC	1500-2100 UTC	(April to September only)

References

Aviation meteorology
Meteorological data and networks